Trevor Charles Rhodes (born 9 August 1948) is an English former professional footballer. Rhodes, who played as a defender, featured for Arsenal, Millwall & Bristol City in his career.

References

1948 births
Living people
English footballers
Arsenal F.C. players
Millwall F.C. players
Bristol City F.C. players
English Football League players
Association football defenders